Giovanni Buonconsiglio (born Montecchio Maggiore c. 1465, died 1535 or 1537; active during 1497–1514) was an Italian painter of the Renaissance period, active mainly in Venice and his native Vicenza. Alternate names: Bonconsigli, Giovanni; Il Marescalco; Marescalco Buonconsiglio; Il Marescalco.

Influences 

Buonconsiglio was probably apprenticed in Vicenza to Bartolomeo Montagna by 1484.
He painted in the style of Giovanni Bellini, but afterwards became a pupil of Antonello da Messina.

Works 

In Vicenza, he painted a Pieta for the church of San Bartolomeo (now in the Musei Civici Vicenza), a Virgin and child with saints for Oratorio de Turchini. He was living as late as 1530 at Venice, for the churches of which city he painted numerous altar-pieces, many of which have unfortunately perished. Among his works are: Virgin and Child (1511)  for the Montagnana Cathedral; a St. Catharine (1513) in Louvre; Portrait of a Woman; Madonna with six Saints (Venice, Gallerie dell'Accademia). Fragments exist of a work in oil for SS. Cosmo e Damiano alla Giudecca representing SS. Benedict, Tecla, and Cosmo (1407); a Virgin and Saints mourning over the dead body of Christ; and Virgin and Child, with Saints Tempera (painted for San Bartolomeo in 1502).

Images 
  Pieta image

References

 
 Oxford Art Online
   Getty Museum Biography, entry on Buonconsiglio.

1460 births
People from Vicenza
15th-century Italian painters
Italian male painters
16th-century Italian painters
Painters from Venice
Painters from Vicenza
Italian Renaissance painters
1530s deaths
1460s births